Luxembourg railway station is the main railway station serving Luxembourg City, in southern Luxembourg. It is operated by Chemins de Fer Luxembourgeois, the state-owned railway company.

80,000 passengers use this station every day.

It is the hub of Luxembourg's domestic railway network, serving as a point of call on all of Luxembourg's railway lines.  It also functions as the country's international railway hub, with services to all the surrounding countries: Belgium, France, and Germany.  Since June 2007, the LGV Est connects the station to the French TGV network.

The station gives its name to Gare, one of the Quarters of Luxembourg City.

History
The original railway station was built entirely from timber, and was opened in 1859.  The position of the new station on the south bank of the Pétrusse, away from the original built-up area of the city, was on account of Luxembourg's role as a German Confederation fortress.  The first connection to the city proper came in 1861, with the construction of the Passerelle viaduct.  After the 1867 Treaty of London, the fortifications were demolished, leading to the expansion of the city around the station.

The old wooden station was replaced by the modern building between 1907 and 1913, at the height of an economic boom, fuelled by iron from the Red Lands.  The new station was designed by a trio of German architects (Rüdell, Jüsgen, and Scheuffel) in the Moselle Baroque Revival style that dominates Luxembourg's major public buildings.  The station lies at the end of the Avenue de la Liberté, one of the city's major thoroughfares, and its imposing clock tower can be seen from a considerable distance.

Modernisation work
In 2006, the Ministry of Transport began a six-year renovation project on Luxembourg station that totaled €95 million. The improvements included new ticketing and sales facilities inside the main hall, expanding platforms, new lifts, a new passenger subway, upgraded overhead electrical wiring, installation of two platform escalators, a new entrance porch, a redesigned forecourt, a glass passenger hall, and a four-storey car park.

Train services
As of December 2017 the station is served by the following services:

High speed services (TGV) Luxembourg - Thionville - Metz - Paris
Intercity services Luxembourg - Ettelbruck - Troisvierges - Gouvy - Liège
Intercity services Luxembourg - Wasserbillig - Trier - Koblenz - Köln - Düsseldorf
Intercity services Luxembourg - Arlon (- Namur - Brussels)
Regional services Luxembourg - Ettelbruck - Diekirch
Regional services Luxembourg - Wasserbillig - Trier - Koblenz
Regional services (TER Lorraine) Luxembourg - Bettembourg - Thionville - Metz - Nancy
Regional services Luxembourg - Bettembourg - Esch - Petange - Rodange
Regional services Luxembourg - Rodange - Athus
Regional services Luxembourg - Rodange - Longwy
Regional services Luxembourg - Kleinbettingen - Arlon

Luxembourg station has some voltage-switchable tracks for Line 50 to Arlon, which is electrified with the Belgian voltage of 3 kV DC. These are due to disappear in 2018

See also
History of rail transport in Luxembourg
Luxembourg railway network

Footnotes

External links
 CFL Gare de Luxembourg official webpage
 
 Rail.lu page on Luxembourg station

Railway stations in Luxembourg City
Railway stations opened in 1859
Railway stations on CFL Line 10
Railway stations on CFL Line 30
Railway stations on CFL Line 50
Railway stations on CFL Line 60
Railway stations on CFL Line 70
Architecture in Luxembourg
Railway stations opened in 1913
1859 establishments in Luxembourg